Silke Renk (born 30 June 1967 in Querfurt, Bezirk Halle) is a retired German javelin thrower.

She represented East Germany at the 1988 Summer Olympics, where she finished fifth, and at the 1990 European Championships where she finished fourth.

She then experienced her career highlight as she won the gold medal at the 1992 Summer Olympics in Barcelona, Spain. Renk won with a throw of 68.34 meters, defeating Natalya Shikolenko, who took home the silver medal, and compatriot Karen Forkel.

The next year she finished sixth at the 1993 World Championships. She withdrew from the 1994 European Championships because of knee injury problems, and never reached another international final despite starting at the 1995 World Championships and the 1996 Summer Olympics.

Her personal best was 71.00 metres with the old javelin type, achieved in June 1988 in Rostock. This ranks her third among German javelin throwers, only behind Petra Felke (who held the world record) and Antje Kempe.

Achievements

References

External links
 
 
 

1967 births
Living people
People from Querfurt
People from Bezirk Halle
German female javelin throwers
Sportspeople from Saxony-Anhalt
Olympic athletes of East Germany
Olympic athletes of Germany
Athletes (track and field) at the 1988 Summer Olympics
Athletes (track and field) at the 1992 Summer Olympics
Athletes (track and field) at the 1996 Summer Olympics
Olympic gold medalists for Germany
World Athletics Championships medalists
Medalists at the 1992 Summer Olympics
Olympic gold medalists in athletics (track and field)
Universiade medalists in athletics (track and field)
Recipients of the Silver Laurel Leaf
Universiade gold medalists for East Germany
World Rowing Championships medalists for Germany
Medalists at the 1989 Summer Universiade
20th-century German women